Vijaya Vilas Palace is a summer palace of Jadeja Maharao of Kutch located on the beach of Mandvi in Kutch, Gujarat, India.

History

Built during the reign of Maharao Shri Khengarji III, the Maharao of Kutch, as a summer resort for the use of his son and heir to the kingdom, the Yuvraj Shri Vijayaraji, it was named after him as Vijaya Vilas Palace. The construction of the palace started in 1920 and was completed in 1929. The palace was built with red sandstone. Its distinctive Rajput architecture largely refers to the plan of palaces of Orchha and Datia. It is designed with a central high dome on pillars, Bengal domes on the sides, windows with colored glass, carved stone 'jalis', domed bastions at the corners, an extended porch and other stone-carved elements. The palace is set in the middle of gardens with water channels and marble fountains. The carved stone works of Jalis, Jharokas, Chhatris, Chhajas, murals and other stone carvings, colored glass work on windows and door panels have all been meticulously crafted  by the architect and craftsman from Jaipur, Rajasthan, Bengal and Saurashtra, and local Kutchi artisan community, the Mistris of Kutch and Suthars. The balcony at top offers a complete view of the surrounding area. The windows ensure the feeling of being in the open space, with sea winds passing through.

The campus also houses a Chhatri of Vijayaraji, who died in 1948.

Present Status

Vijaya Vilas Palace has its own private beach. It offers overnight accommodation. The royal family of Kutch State now reside permanently in the palace after the 2001 Gujarat earthquake in which one of the wings of another palace at Bhuj - the Ranjit Vilas - was heavily damaged. The Palace also houses a museum.

In popular culture

Scenes from the Bollywood movies Hum Dil De Chuke Sanam, Lagaan, and Commando as well as a number of Gujarati films, were filmed in the palace.

References

Palaces in Gujarat
Royal residences in India
Tourist attractions in Kutch district
Rajput architecture
History of Kutch
Buildings and structures completed in 1929
Houses completed in 1929
Indo-Saracenic Revival architecture
20th-century architecture in India